A crop is a plant grown and harvested for agricultural use.

Crop may also refer to:

 Crop (anatomy), a dilation of the esophagus that stores and softens food
 Crop (implement), a modified whip used in horseback riding or disciplining humans as punishment
 Crop factor, a multiplier factor in digital imaging, compared to 35mm film camera focal length
 Crop (hairstyle), a woman's short hairstyle
 CROP (polling firm), a Canadian polling and market research company
 Cropping (punishment), the removal of a person's ears as a punishment
 Cropping (animal), cutting the ears of an animal shorter, usually trimming to shape the pinnae
 Cropping (image), to remove unwanted outer parts of an image
 Scrapbooking, also called cropping, the creation of cards and or scrap-books in unique and creative ways as a hobby
 The Crop, a 2004 Australian comedy film
 "The Crop" (short story), a 1947 short story by Flannery O'Connor

CROP may also stand for:
 Council of Regional Organisations in the Pacific
 Church Rural Overseas Program, a former initiative of Church World Service, whose name survives in CWS' CROP Walk fundraising events
 CROP (gene), cisplatin resistance-associated overexpressed protein

See also
 Docking (animal), sometimes called cropping, the removal of the tail of an animal